General Hospital, Lagos, is the oldest hospital in Nigeria.

History
General Hospital, Lagos Odan is situated in Odan, Lagos Island,  between Broad Street and Marina in the central business district.
The hospital is one of the several general hospitals of the Lagos State Government. It was established in 1893 as a British military hospital, and was the first general hospital in Nigeria.

On 1 October 1960, the hospital was handed over to the Federal Government and on 7 May 1967, it was finally taken over by the Lagos State Government. 
The Nursing School was established in 1952. Other services which commenced included general outpatient services, surgery, and obstetrics and gynecology. The obstetrics and gynaecology department was transferred to Massey Street (Ita Eleiye), where most prominent Lagosians were born. The Nigerian Medical Association (NMA) was established at the hospital. The hospital has served as a training center for doctors, pharmacists, nurses, radiographers and medical technologists across the country.

Services
General Outpatient
Inpatient treatment facility
General Medicine
Surgery
Ophthalmology
Orthopaedics
Physiotherapy
Maternity
Obstetrics and Gynaecology
Paediatrics
Emergency Services
Nursing Care
Pharmacy
Pathology
Blood Bank (began operating at Massey Street Children Hospital for maternal cases)
Radiology (established 1913)
Chest clinic (established for the care of patients with tuberculosis.)
Dental Care
Physical Medicine 
Medical Rehabilitation centre

See also
 List of hospitals in Lagos

References

External links

Hospitals established in 1893
Hospitals in Lagos
Lagos Island
1893 establishments in Lagos Colony
History of Lagos
19th-century establishments in Lagos